Events from the year 1775 in Sweden

Incumbents
 Monarch – Gustav III

Events

 The first maternity hospital, Allmänna BB, is opened in the capital.
 Manganese is isolated by Johan Gottlieb Gahn.
 The manufacture of brännvin are taken over by the state, but the project does not meet with success as the Swedish public continue to manufacture it at home. 
 Marstrand is made the only free port in Sweden. 
 Afhandling om Bitter-, Selzer-, Spa- och Pyrmonter-Vatten samt deras tillredande genom konst by Torbern Bergman.
 By royal letter, all women in need of support are allowed to sell used items freely, such as used clothes, used furniture and other items which they had not made themselves and which were not recently manufactures and thereby would not disturb the privilege of the guild.
 Barbara Pauli establish her fashion shop in Stockholm, which becomes a center of fashion in the capital.

Births

 Gustav Åbergsson, actor  (died 1852)
 
 
 
 Ebba Modée, courtier (died 1840)

Deaths

 
 
 16 May - Ulla von Liewen, courtier and royal mistress  (born 1747)
 Rosa Scarlatti, opera singer  (born 1727)

References

 
Years of the 18th century in Sweden
1775 by country